The 1987 Fujifilm Trophy was the competition of the 1987–88 figure skating season and a senior-level international invitational competition. Medals were awarded in the disciplines of men's singles, ladies' singles, pair skating, and ice dancing.

Results

Men

Ladies

Pairs

Ice dancing

External links
 Skate Canada results

Fujifilm Trophy, 1987
Bofrost Cup on Ice